Baltim (  ) is a city in the Kafr El Sheikh Governorate, in the north coast of Egypt.

History 
The second part of the town's name preserves  "end, furthest part (of Egypt)".

Baltim was the beneficiary of a tax reduction under the reign of the sultan Barquq. Ibn Battuta noted it as the capital of the district of Burullus, a position which it held through the late 1800s.

The 1885 Census of Egypt recorded Baltim as a nahiyah in the district of Aklim el-Borollos in Gharbia Governorate; at that time, the population of the city was 4,286 (2,182 men and 2,104 women).

Climate 
Baltim's climate is typical to the northern coastal line which is the most moderate in Egypt. It features a hot desert climate (Köppen: BWh), but prevailing winds from the Mediterranean Sea greatly moderate the temperatures, making its summers moderately hot and humid while its winters mild and moderately wet.

Port Said, El Qoseir, Baltim,  Damietta and Alexandria have the least temperature variation in Egypt, additionally, Rafah, Alexandria, Abu Qir, Rosetta, Baltim, Kafr El Dawwar and Mersa Matruh are the wettest.

Another source reports less variable temperatures and more precipitation, which would classify it as a hot steppe climate (BsH) in the Koppen climate classification system.

See also 

 Battle of Baltim
 Northern coast of Egypt
 Climate of Egypt
 Geography of Egypt
 Mediterranean Sea
 List of cities and towns in Egypt

References

External links
Official site

Populated places in Kafr El Sheikh Governorate
Seaside resorts in Egypt
Cities in Egypt
Tourist attractions in Egypt